Theatre Deli is an arts organisation founded by Jessica Brewster, Frances Loy, Mauricio Preciado Awad and Roland Smith in 2007. Theatre Deli operates to expand opportunities for people to make and experience art. The main way in which Theatre Deli does this is by taking over empty buildings and using them to provide the space, support and resources to develop and share in art & performance.

Over the first decade of its existence Theatre Deli transformed 10 empty buildings, opened up over 200,000 square feet for rehearsal studios, workspaces and performances, and put £1.7million directly into the hands of artists. Theatre Deli has become instrumental in the development of early career artists.

In June 2017, Theatre Deli partnered with British Land, GIC and The Nursery Theatre to create a workspace for artists at Broadgate, London.

The company currently has two active sites 2 Finsbury Avenue, Broadgate, London and 202 Eyre Street in Sheffield. Former locations include 119 Farringdon Road previously occupied by The Guardian, 35 Marylebone High Street in a building previously occupied by the BBC, 3-4 Picton Place, and Cavendish Gate, 295 Regent Street, courtesy of their sponsors the Property Merchant Group, who own the building.

In April 2020, Theatre Deli appointed a new executive director, David Ralf, who was previously the executive director of The Bunker theatre.

In June 2021 Theatre Deli announced the appointment of Nathan Geering and Ryan David Harston as co-artistic directors of the charity

Previous productions
Sept–Oct 2010: Theatre Souk ... curated by Jessica Brewster
Feb–Mar 2010: Mercury Fur ... by Philip Ridley
Nov–Dec 2009: Tis the Season to be Jolly...As F**k ...a Christmas theatre festival
Jul–Aug 2009: Pedal Pusher ... by Roland Smith
Apr–Mar 2009: The Winter's Tale ... by William Shakespeare
Dec 2008: Elle and the Cabaret of the Cavendish Club ... by Roland Smith
Jul–Aug 2008: Fanshen ... by David Hare
Jan–Mar 2008: A Midsummer Night's Dream ... by William Shakespeare

Upcoming productions
June 2021: The Perfect Crime ... Created and produced by Rogue Productions
July 2021: Pandemic in the City ... Produced by Katherine Webb

References

External links
theatredeli website

Theatre companies in the United Kingdom
Fringe theatre
Theatre companies in England
Theatre companies in London